Fujii (written:  lit. "well of wisteria") is a Japanese surname. Notable people with the surname include:

 , professional baseball catcher
 , Japanese astronomer
 , professional baseball outfielder
 , football player
 Don Fujii, ring name of wrestler 
 , Japanese musician
 , singer-songwriter and musician
 , Japanese footballer
 Henry Hajimu Fujii (1906–1976), American pioneer, farmer, lapidary, spokesman
 , Japanese photographer
 , diplomat and president of the Japan Foundation
 , politician
 Hiromu Fujii (born 1935), baseball player
 , engineer and manager for Mitsubishi Motors
 , murder victim in the 1994 Oriental Hotel Murder
 , handball player
 , singer, dancer, model and actress
 , mixed martial artist and professional wrestler
 , actress and voice actress
 , diplomat
 Kenta Fujii (born 1994), Grand Prix motorcycle racer
 , Japanese footballer
 , admiral in the Imperial Japanese Navy
 , Japanese commercial fashion model, singer, and actress
 , volleyball player
 , professional baseball player
 , Japanese mixed martial artist
 , tennis player
 , shōjo manga artist
 , Japanese-American actress. 
 , badminton player
 , Japanese table tennis player
 , Japanese racewalker
 , volleyball player
 , Buddhist monk and founder of the Nipponzan-Myōhōji order
 , Japanese table tennis player
 , international table tennis player
 Raika Fujii (born 1974), synchronized swimmer
 , known for abandoning her two infant children
 , manga illustrator
 Ryo Fujii (born 1996) is a Hong Kong-born Japanese professional soccer player
  is a professional baseball player
 , Japanese poet and scholar of Japanese literature
 , avant-garde jazz pianist, accordionist and composer
 , human rights activist
 , handball player
 , judoka
 , professional baseball pitcher
 , dancer, fashion model, actress, and singer
 , Japanese shogi player
 , Japanese ice hockey player
 , Japanese science fiction author
 , politician and member of the Japanese Diet
 , Japanese comedian
 , Japanese footballer
 , football player
 , Japanese shogi player
 , competitive swimmer
 , amateur astronomer and prolific discoverer of minor planets
 , racing driver
 , footballer
 Tsutomu Fujii (1840–1880), politician and governor of Hiroshima Prefecture
 , Japanese swimmer
 , professional baseball outfielder
 , researcher in anesthesiology who fabricated data in at least 183 scientific paper
 , politician and member of the Japanese Diet
 , actress and voice actress
 , softball player
 , football

See also 
 
 Fuji (disambiguation)
 Fujii Station, a railway station on the JR West Obama Line in Fukui, Japan

Japanese-language surnames